Campioni is an Italian surname.

Geographical distribution
As of 2014, 60.5% of all known bearers of the surname Campioni were residents of Italy (frequency 1:27,915), 24.4% of Brazil (1:231,611), 5.0% of France (1:369,486), 2.6% of the United States (1:3,802,645), 2.0% of Argentina (1:602,021), 1.4% of Germany (1:1,604,573), 1.0% of Belgium (1:328,497) and 1.0% of Canada (1:1,051,372).

In Italy, the frequency of the surname was higher than national average (1:27,915) in the following regions:
 1. Tuscany (1:6,160)
 2. Lazio (1:7,631)
 3. Marche (1:11,470)
 4. Umbria (1:16,439)
 5. Emilia-Romagna (1:20,664)
 6. Veneto (1:23,676)

People
Carlo Antonio Campioni (1720-1788), also known as Carlo Antonio Campione and as Charles Antoine Campion, an Italian composer and collector of early music
Inigo Campioni (1878-1944), an Italian admiral
Miel Campioni (1901-1962), also known as Marie Johannes Jacobus Campioni, a Dutch football (soccer) player

References

Italian-language surnames
Surnames of Italian origin